Amolops jinjiangensis is a species of frog in the family Ranidae. It is endemic to China where it is found in Yunnan and Sichuan provinces. Amolops jinjiangensis is a common species inhabiting hill streams inside forests. 
It is threatened by habitat loss.

References

jinjiangensis
Amphibians of China
Endemic fauna of China
Amphibians described in 1986
Taxonomy articles created by Polbot